Martti Leo Tolamo (born Topelius; 21 February 1907 – 14 March 1940) was a Finnish athlete. He competed in the Olympic Games as a decathlete and a long jumper; his other strong event was the non-Olympic pentathlon, in which he broke the unofficial world record in 1930 and won two medals, including a gold, at the International University Games.

Career
At the 1928 Olympics in Amsterdam Tolamo competed in the decathlon, placing 16th. The following year he exceeded the Finnish long jump record with a jump of 7.42 m, but due to wind assistance that record could not be ratified.

At the 1930 Finnish Championships at Tampere he won the pentathlon with 4011 points, an unofficial world record. He also triumphed at that year's International University Games, scoring 3979 points to secure gold ahead of Latvia's Jānis Dimza. Tolamo's world record was broken the following year by javelin thrower Matti Sippala; however, with modern scoring tables Tolamo's score would have remained the record, and it eventually re-emerged as a national pentathlon best, only broken in 2007.

Tolamo legitimately broke the Finnish long jump record in 1933 in a dual meet between Finland and Norway, jumping 7.46 m. At that year's International University Games he won silver in the long jump and bronze in the pentathlon. He broke his own national long jump record in September 1934, in another dual meet (between Finland and Germany); he jumped 7.51 m and defeated both Wilhelm Leichum, who had won the European championship the previous week, and future Olympic silver medalist Luz Long. That jump remained the Finnish record until 1954, when Jorma Valkama broke it.

Tolamo returned to the Olympics in 1936, competing in both the decathlon and the long jump. He failed to make the final in the long jump and did not finish in the decathlon.

He was killed in action in 1940.

References

1907 births
1940 deaths
People from Kangasniemi
People from Mikkeli Province (Grand Duchy of Finland)
Finnish decathletes
Finnish male long jumpers
Olympic athletes of Finland
Athletes (track and field) at the 1928 Summer Olympics
Athletes (track and field) at the 1936 Summer Olympics
Sportspeople from South Savo